James Katz may refer to:

 James C. Katz, American film historian and preservationist
 James E. Katz, communication scholar